Raja Pratap Singh was the founder Raja of Barauli, in the Aligarh district. He was chief of Bargujar Rajput clan and close associate of Prithiviraj Chauhan, who founded his kingdom with capital at Barauli near Bulandshahar after defeating the Meos from Pahasu, Dibai and Anupshahr. He belonged to the Bargujar rulers of Macheri near Alwar and was invited by Prithviraj Chauhan to this area.

He settled in Pahasu in the centre of his newly acquired estate, where he rapidly acquired great power. Raja Pratap Singh married the daughter of Raja Door and populated the town of Barauli in Samvat 1122 (1065 AD) when there were 1656 villages attached to it.

References

External links
 

11th-century Indian monarchs

People from Aligarh district
Bargujar